"What Became of the Likely Lads" is a song by the Libertines, which was released as the final single from their self-titled, second album, The Libertines. The lyrics in this song ("What became of the dreams we had?", "What became of forever?") refer to the breakdown of the friendship between Pete Doherty and Carl Barât, and the subsequent collapse of the band. The song's title (and the chorus's lyrics) echo the title of a popular British situation comedy from the 1970s: Whatever Happened to the Likely Lads? The song reached number nine on the UK Singles Chart when released.

Pete Doherty claimed in an interview with Newsnight that he had no input for the video of the song, which does not feature the band but two young boys on a council estate (Thamesmead), implied to be a young Pete and Carl. This is incorrect to the story of the two, because they did not meet each other until their late teens.

According to Carl Barât, in the cover photo, Doherty is not wearing a watch.

Track listings
CD 1
 "What Became of the Likely Lads"
 "Skag & Bone Man" (Live, Brixton, 6 March 2004)
 "Time for Heroes" (Live, Brixton, 6 March 2004)

CD 2
 "What Became of the Likely Lads" (Re-worked)
 "The Delaney" (Live, Brixton, 6 March 2004)

7"
 "What Became of the Likely Lads"
 "Boys In The Band" (Live, Brixton, 6 March 2004)

US CD EP
 "What Became Of The Likely Lads" (Reworked version)
 "Skag And Bone Man" (Live Brixton Sat 6/3/04)
 "Time For Heroes" (Live Brixton Sat 6/3/04)
 "The Delaney" (Live Brixton Sat 6/3/04)
 "Boys In The Band" (Live Brixton Sat 6/3/04)
 "Don't Look Back Into The Sun" (Mick Jones Version)
 "What Became Of The Likely Lads" (Album Version)

Charts

References

2004 songs
2004 singles
The Libertines songs
Rough Trade Records singles
Songs written by Pete Doherty
Songs written by Carl Barât
Song recordings produced by Mick Jones (The Clash)
Music videos directed by Johan Renck
UK Independent Singles Chart number-one singles